Umar Barde Yakubu is a Nigerian politician. He is the minority whip of the Nigerian House of Representatives.

Umar was elected into office of Nigerian House of Representative in 2003 representing Chikun and Kajuru federal constituency of Kaduna State under the People's Democratic Party of Nigeria.

Education 
Umar studied agricultural economics at Abubakar Tafawa Balewa University and graduated with an MSc.

References 

Living people
People from Kaduna State
Nigerian politicians
Year of birth missing (living people)
Abubakar Tafawa Balewa University alumni